Juan Francisco Elso (August 1956 – 1988), born Juan Francisco Elso Padilla in Havana, Cuba was a Cuban artist. He created art in a variety of media, such as drawing, painting, engraving, and sculpture, and also did installations. In 1972, he finished his studies in the Escuela Nacional de Bellas Artes “San Alejandro” in Havana. From 1972–1976, he studied in Escuela Nacional de Arte in Havana. He was also a teacher at 20 de Octubre School of Arts during the 1970s and 1980s.

Individual exhibitions
In 1982 he presented his first personal exhibition, "Tierra, maíz, vida" at the Casa de Cultura de Plaza in Havana. In 1986 he presented "Ensayo sobre América" at the same venue. In 1990, "Por América" was shown at the Museo de Arte Alvar y Carmen T. de Carrillo Gil in México. In 1991, "Latin American Spirituality. The sculpture of Juan Francisco Elso (1984-1988)" was shown at M.I.T. List Visual Arts Center in Boston, Massachusetts, in the United States.

Collective exhibitions
He took part in many collective exhibitions like Volumen I at the Centro de Arte Internacional in Havana in 1981. In 1984, he was selected to participate in the I Bienal de La Habana at the Museo Nacional de Bellas Artes (MNBA) in Havana. In 1986, he participated at the XLII Biennale di Venezia in Venice, Italy and also in the second Havana Biennial Bienal de La Habana at the MNBA. In 1988, he was involved in Signs of Transition: 80's Art from Cuba at the Museum of Contemporary Hispanic Art in New York City. In 1997, he was part of "Así está la cosa. Instalación y arte objeto en América Latina" at the Centro Cultural Arte Contemporáneo in A.C., México.

Awards
In 1982, Elso obtained the First Prize in "Salón Paisaje'82"', at the MNBA.

Collections
His work can be found in collections such as the Centro Cultural/Arte Contemporáneo in A.C., México; Magali Lara, México; and the MNBA, Cuba.

References
 
 Juan Francisco Elso; Latin American spirituality, the sculpture of Juan Francisco Elso, 1984-1988, (MIT List Visual Arts Center 1991); 
  Jose Veigas-Zamora, Cristina Vives Gutierrez, Adolfo V. Nodal, Valia Garzon, Dannys Montes de Oca; Memoria: Cuban Art of the 20th Century; (California/International Arts Foundation 2001); 
 Jose Veigas; Memoria: Artes Visuales Cubanas Del Siglo Xx; (California International Arts 2004);   
 Kwame Anthony Appiah and Henry Louis Gates, Africana: The Encyclopedia of the African and African American Experience; (Basic Civitas Books 1999);

External links

 Cuba Now website article on the artist
 Art Facts webpage on artist

Cuban contemporary artists
Artists from Havana
1956 births
1988 deaths